The Philippines men's national basketball team, led by head coach Yeng Guiao secured their qualification in the 2019 FIBA Basketball World Cup in the second round of the Asian qualifiers. The national team were drawn in Group D for the group phase of the FIBA Basketball World Cup with Serbia, Italy, and Angola.

A squad with a different composition from the FIBA Basketball World Cup team will also participate in the 2019 Southeast Asian Games to be hosted at home in the Philippines.

Record

Tournaments

FIBA Basketball World Cup qualification
Phase: Second round

FIBA Basketball World Cup

Group phase

Classification round

Málaga pocket tournament
The Philippines participated at a pocket tournament in the port city of Málaga in Spain as part of their preparations for the World Cup.

Southeast Asian Games
To be announced

Exhibition games

Roster

2019 FIBA Basketball World Cup

See also
2018 Philippines national basketball team results

References

Philippines men's national basketball team results
2018–19 in Philippine basketball